The 2003–04 season saw Partick Thistle compete in the Scottish Premier League where they finished in 12th position with 26 points, suffering relegation to the Scottish First Division.

Final league table

Results
Partick Thistle's score comes first

Legend

Scottish Premier League

Scottish Cup

Scottish League Cup

References

External links
 Partick Thistle 2003–04 at Soccerbase.com (select relevant season from dropdown list)

Partick Thistle F.C. seasons
Partick Thistle